Endotricha vinolentalis is a species of snout moth in the genus Endotricha. It was described by Émile Louis Ragonot in 1891, and is known from Ivory Coast, Gambia, Cameroons, Sierra Leone, Ghana and Kenya.

References

Moths described in 1891
Endotrichini
Moths of Africa
Moths of the Comoros
Moths of Seychelles